Cyclocybe aegerita, also called Agrocybe cylindracea, Agrocybe aegerita or Pholiota aegerita, is a mushroom in the genus Cyclocybe which is commonly known as the poplar mushroom, or velvet pioppini. In Japan, it is called .

Description
Underneath, it has numerous whitish radial plates adherent to the foot, later turning to a brownish-grey colour, and light elliptic spores of 8–11 by 5–7 micrometres. The white fibre foot is generally curved, having a membranous ring on the top part which promptly turns to tobacco colour due to the falling spores. When very young, its colour may be reddish-brown and later turn to a light brown colour, more ochre towards the centre, whiter around its border. It grows in tufts on logs and holes in poplars, and other large-leaved trees.

Edibility 
The mushroom is cultivated commercially and it is typical ingredient found in both Southern European and Chinese cuisine.

In East Asia, it is used fresh and rehydrated in various dishes, including stir-fry, soup, stew, and hot pot. It has a soft cap and a harder stem. Picking specimens from the wild is not recommended due to the difficulty of identification.

Uses
It is cultivated and sold in the United States, Chile, Japan, Korea, Italy, Australia and China. The cultivation in the Mediterranean region is very old, e.g. it is described in the book Naturalis Historia by Pliny the Elder. In Traditional Chinese medicine, it is often used as a diuretic. The fungi C. aegerita, M. alliaceus and C. purpureum are suitable organisms for counteracting OMW plant toxicity.

Gallery

References

Edible fungi
Fungi in cultivation
Strophariaceae